Alan  is a South African comic actor and qualified high school teacher.

 has performed on stage, television, radio and the Internet. In addition to his own, self-written shows,  has performed a number of other stage productions including Rob Becker's Defending the Caveman. He is particularly well known for his character 'Johan van der Walt', a highly officious, disturbingly pedantic, offensive security officer and part-time film critic.

Performance career

's own stage plays

Stressed for Success
Stressed to Kill
One Man One Remote
TV or not TV
Titanic on Ice
Once upon a Laugh  (with Robyn Scott)
Dracula - Unclotted (with Geatan Schmid)
Dick and Di
The Clown Jewels Part 2
The Clown Jewels Part 1

Appearing in

Rob Becker's Defending the Caveman
Tom Stoppard's Rosencrantz and Guildenstern Are Dead
Michael Frayn's Noises Off

Other appearances

Fleur du Cap Awards as Master of Ceremonies, Baxter Theatre, Cape Town (2008)
Stand Up South Africa Comedy Festival in London, UK (2002)
Smirnoff International Comedy Festival (1997–2003)

Television

Appearing as Johan van der Walt in M-Net's Laugh out Loud
Starring as Johan van der Walt in M-Net's Van der Walt's Fault
Cameo appearances in many SA sitcoms including Marc Lottering and Friends
Appearing in various TV adverts including FAMSA, Polo Classic, OK Bazaars, Castle Lager and Cadbury's
Character voice-over for SABC's animation series URBO.

Radio

Character voices for various radio spots
"Unofficial" film reviewer as Johan van der Walt for Nic Marais' breakfast show on KFM

Internet

Performed and co-wrote a number of viral ads for Rugby 365

Awards

Naledi Theatre Awards 'Best Comedy Performance (Male)' for Stressed To Kill (Johannesburg, 2008)
Fleur du Cap Awards 'Best Performance by an actor' in Rosencrantz and Guildenstern Are Dead (Cape Town, 2008)
S.A. Film & Television Awards 'Golden Horn for Best Supporting Actor in a TV Comedy' for 's role of Johan van der Walt (Johannesburg, 2007)

Education
Higher Diploma in Education, University of Cape Town
Performer's Diploma, University of Cape Town
Bachelor of Arts, University of Cape Town (1996)

References

External links
Alan 's website
Johan van der Walt's website
Video clips of  performing

Living people
South African male comedians
Year of birth missing (living people)
Place of birth missing (living people)